Western Odisha is the western part of the state of Odisha in India, extending from the Kalahandi district in the south to the Sundargarh district in the north.

History
Historically it has been included within the larger region of Greater Kalinga. Its territory has been ruled by various dynasties, including:

Mahameghavahana dynasty:
2nd or 1st century BC to early 4th century CE. The primary source is King Kharavela's rock-cut Hathigumpha inscription.
Gupta Empire
Bhauma-Kara dynasty
Somavamshi dynasty:
Somavamshi King Janamajaya-I Mahabhavagupta (c. 882–922 CE) consolidated the eastern part of his kingdom comprising the modern undivided Sambalpur and Bolangir districts and established a matrimonial relationship with the Bhauma-Kara dynasty ruling over modern coastal Odisha. After Uddyotakeshari (c. 1040–1065 CE), the Somavamshi kingdom declined gradually.
After the decline of the Somavamshis the area came under the Telugu Chodas for a short period. The last Telugu Choda king of south Kosala was Somesvara III, who was defeated by Kalachuri king Jajalladeva-I around 1110 CE.
Kalachuri Dynasty:
Jajalla-deva, a ruler of the Kalachuri dynasty of Ratanpur (the historical capital of Chhattisgarh), defeated the ruler of Sonpur and annexed it to his kingdom in 1110. The region was administered under the Kalachuri rulers of Ratanpur from 1110 to 1238.
Eastern Ganga Dynasty:
The last ruler of the Kalachuri Dynasty, Pratapmalla, invaded the frontiers of the Ganga territory along with his son Paramardi Dev. Anangabhima Deva III, the Eastern Ganga ruler, sent a large force under the command of his able Brahman commander, Vishnu. The two forces met face to face at the Seori Narayana village in undivided Sambalpur district on the banks of the river called Bhima near the Vindhya hills and the Kalchuris were defeated for the first time by the Gangas. The Chateswara Temple Inscription of Anangabhima mentions that Vishnu terrorized the Kalachuri king so much that the latter "perceived Vishnu every where through out his kingdom."[7] Pratapmalla was taken prisoner and forced to cede the Sambalpur-Sonepur-Bolangir tracts along with parts of what is now Chhattishgarh state to the Ganga kingdom. Later, with the advice of his minister Vishnu, Anangabhima established a diplomatic and matrimonial alliance with the Kalachuris by offering the hand of his daughter Chandrika in marriage to the Kalachuri prince, Paramardi Dev. Once the alliance was secured, the Ganga forces multiplied in strength. Paramardi Dev died in the final recorded battle of Narasingha Deva I's invasion of Bengal at Umurdan (present-day Amarda in Mayurbhanj district).
Gajapati Empire:
After the Eastern Ganga dynasty, Western Odisha was ruled by the mighty Gajapati Empire. Under Kapilendra Deva, the Gajapatis built an empire stretching from the lower Ganga in the north to the Kaveri in the south. But continued aggression of the Bengal sultanate from the north and Vijayanagara and Bahmani empires from the south weakened the Gajapati empire. Ultimately, Ramai Deva, a Chauhan Rajput from North India, founded Chauhan rule in western Orissa. According to the details placed in all the contemporary literary accounts, Ramai Deva was born to one of the queens of Hutumbur Sing, alias Hambir Dev. His pregnant queen, Jayanti Devi, fled Garh Sambhar with some of her followers when Vishala Dev was killed by a Muslim king in a battle, who has been identified with Firuz Shah Tughlaq. Jayanti Devi found refuge in the house of a Brahmin ruler of Kholangarh division of the Patna state known as Chakradhar Panigrahi. Ramai Deva possibly murdered or killed the rulers and became ruler of this region.

Natural resources
The Western Odisha region is rich with minerals. Iron ore is available in plenty at Tensa and Barsuan in Sundargarh district, bauxite is available at Gandhamardan in Bargarh district, and coal is available in Himgir in Sundargarh district and Rampur in Jharsuguda district. Dolomite is available at Dubulabera and Kangorama in Sambalpur district and Lephripada in Sundargarh district. Graphite is available at Patnagarh and Titilagarh in Balangir district. Manganese ore is available in Balangir district. Fireclay is available at Belpahar in Jharsuguda district, Gandawara in Sambalpur district, and some places of Sundargarh district.

Demographics

Population

(Source: Population of India, 2011)

In addition to the ten districts listed above and shown on the map, the Western Odisha Development Council includes Anugul on its website.

Art and culture
Western Odisha is culturally influenced by several different cults and religions. Its history dates back to the Mahabharat and Buddhist period. Folk songs and dances of this area have been revived and recognized during the last quarter century, including Danda (Danda Yatra and Danda Nata), which is considered to be one of the oldest forms of variety entertainment in India, as well as the modern "Krushnaguru Bhajan", a type of folk lyrics and songs. Sambalpuri songs are quite popular throughout Odisha. Some hits include Rangabati, Ekda Ekda, Dalkhai, and Panbala Babu.

Rangabati is a modern Sambalpuri song inspired by folk music, written about 1975, which enjoyed international popularity in the 1970s and 1980s. It was sung by Jitendra Haripal and Krishna Patel. The music was composed by Prabhudutta Pradhan and the lyrics by Mitrabhanu Gauntia. The song was recorded and broadcast by All India Radio, Sambalpur.

Temples
Nrusinghanath Temple
Chari Sambhu Temple
Leaning Temple of Huma
Maa Samaleswari temple
Lord Jagarnath Temple
Manikeshwari Temple
Yogeswar Temple
Harishankar Temple

References

Regions of Odisha